Luxembourg competed at the 1928 Summer Olympics in Amsterdam, Netherlands. 48 competitors, 46 men and 2 women, took part in 31 events in 10 sports.

Athletics

Boxing

Men's Flyweight (– 50.8 kg)
 Jean Kieffer
 First Round — Lost to Alfredo Gaona (MEX), points

Cycling

Four cyclists represented Luxembourg in 1928.

Individual road race
 Jean-Pierre Muller
 Norbert Sinner
 Jean Alfonsetti
 Marcel Pesch

Team pursuit
 Jean-Pierre Muller
 Norbert Sinner
 Jean Alfonsetti

Football

Gymnastics

Swimming

Water polo

Weightlifting

Wrestling

References

External links
Official Olympic Reports

Nations at the 1928 Summer Olympics
1928
1928 in Luxembourgian sport